Bréal-sous-Montfort (literally Bréal under Montfort) is a commune in the Ille-et-Vilaine department in the region in Brittany in northwestern France.

It is located in the outer southwest district of Rennes, near the Broceliand woods.

Geography
The Meu forms the commune's northeastern border.

Population
Inhabitants of Bréal-sous-Montfort are called Bréalais in French.

See also
Communes of the Ille-et-Vilaine department

References

External links

Official website 

 Cultural Heritage 
Mayors of Ille-et-Vilaine Association 

Communes of Ille-et-Vilaine